Daniel Lamont "Bubba" Franks (born January 6, 1978) is an American former professional football player who was a tight end for nine seasons in the National Football League (NFL).  He played college football for the University of Miami.  He was selected by the Green Bay Packers in the first round of the 2000 NFL Draft with the 14th overall pick.

Early years
Bubba attended Big Spring High School in Big Spring, Texas and was an all state tight end there.

College career
Franks played collegiate football at the University of Miami, where he was known for his extraordinary one-handed receptions. He redshirted in 1996, but was very productive in the 1997, 1998, and 1999 seasons, setting the University of Miami record for most touchdowns by a tight end, with 12. He was also named to the All-Big East team twice and was named as an All-American in 1999.

Franks waived his final year of eligibility to enter the 2000 NFL Draft and was selected in the first round, with the 14th overall selection, by the Green Bay Packers.

Awards and honors
Second-team All-Big East (1997)
Sporting News Freshman All-American (1997)
First-team All-Big East (1998–1999)
All-American (1999)

Professional career

Green Bay Packers
After a promising but unspectacular rookie season, he reached the Pro Bowl his second NFL year, during which he caught nine touchdown passes. Franks went to three Pro Bowls all together (2001, 2002, and 2003). He missed much of the 2005 season with knee and neck injuries.

On February 20, 2008, Franks was released by the Packers after an unproductive and injury-plagued 2007 season in which he was demoted to second string TE behind Donald Lee.

New York Jets
On March 16, 2008, Franks agreed to terms with the New York Jets on a one-year deal. Franks was released on July 13, 2009.

NFL statistics

Personal
Has a wife, Raquel, son, Daniel II, and daughter, Sienna.

References

External links

New York Jets bio

1978 births
Living people
Players of American football from Riverside, California
American football tight ends
National Conference Pro Bowl players
Miami Hurricanes football players
Green Bay Packers players
New York Jets players
People from Big Spring, Texas